Keith William Robertson (born 5 December 1954 in Hawick, Scotland) is a former Scotland international rugby union player.

Rugby Union career

Amateur career

Robertson played for Melrose.

Richard Bath writes of him that:

Provincial career

He played for South of Scotland.

International career

He played for Scotland 'B' on 19 March 1978.

He played for Scotland forty four times between 1978 and 1989. He played at both wing and centre, the latter twenty times out of his forty four caps.

Keith Robertson was a major part of Scotland's Grand Slam in 1984.

He was never selected for the British Lions.

Media career

After retiring he became involved in Borders rugby, and was one of the major Scottish advocates of professionalism in rugby union.

He occasionally appears on STV's rugby programme.

References

Sources

External links

 Sporting Heroes profile – page 1
 Sporting Heroes profile – page 2

1954 births
Living people
Melrose RFC players
Rugby union players from Hawick
Scotland international rugby union players
Scottish rugby union players
Rugby union centres
Scotland 'B' international rugby union players
South of Scotland District (rugby union) players